Nkutu (Nkuchu, Kitkutshu) is a Bantu language of northern Kasai-Oriental Province, Democratic Republic of the Congo. It is a member of the Tetela group of Bantu languages.

References

Tetela languages
Languages of the Democratic Republic of the Congo